Herbert Rose Barraud (24 August 1845 – 27 November 1896) was a noted portrait photographer who had studios in London and Liverpool.

Career 
Between 1873 and 1880 he had a partnership, Barraud & Jerrard, with George Milner Gibson Jerrard (1848–1918). He produced cabinet photographs of many famous Victorian statesmen, artists, and members of the aristocracy, many of which were published in his two-volume work, Men and Women of the Day, 1888-89.

Most of Barraud's images were Woodburytypes, then a newly developed process which lent itself admirably to portraiture, being able to render middle tones accurately.

Barraud's studios were at 96 Gloucester Place, Portman Square in 1883, at 263 Oxford Street ("A few doors west of 'The Circus'") between 1883 and 1891, at 73 Piccadilly from 1893 to 1896, and at 126 Piccadilly in 1897. Another studio was located at 92 Bold Street, Liverpool.

Personal life 
Herbert's brother was Francis James Barraud (1856–1924), an artist celebrated for having created "His Master's Voice", a painting used in advertising by the early HMV gramophone records. His father was the painter Henry Barraud; his son Cyril Henry Barraud was also an artist.

Selected works

References

External links

Woodburytypes - Alan F. Elliott
National Portrait Gallery
Argentic Photo 

British portrait photographers
1845 births
1896 deaths
Photographers from Liverpool
Photographers from London
Artists' Rifles soldiers
19th-century English photographers